The Tanggu La, Tangla Pass, or Tanggu Pass is a wide mountain pass in Southwest China over  in elevation, which utilized by both the Qinghai–Tibet Highway and Qinghai–Tibet Railway to cross the Tanggula Mountains.  These mountains on the Tibetan Plateau separate the Tibet Autonomous Region from the Qinghai province, and also form part of the watershed separating the Yangtze River to the north from a zone of endorheic basins with internal drainage to the south.

The Qinghai–Tibet railway connects the provincial capitals of Xining to Lhasa. The -long section from Golmud to Lhasa was opened on July 1, 2006. The rail cars are equipped with personal oxygen supplies to prevent altitude sickness.

Climate

References

External links
  (Published before construction of railway.)
  (Published before construction of railway. Highway pass elevation given as 5,149 m.)

Mountain passes of Tibet
Mountain passes of China
Tibetan Plateau
Amdo